Aasheim is a surname. Notable people with the surname include:

Anne Aasheim (1962–2016), Norwegian editor
Tor André Skimmeland Aasheim (born 1996), Norwegian footballer

See also
Alsheim
Asheim

Norwegian-language surnames